Psili korfi means "high peak" in Greek and may refer to any peak but specifically:

Mount Juktas in Crete
The highest peak of the Acarnanian Mountains